Gold Chains is an electro rap musician (born Christopher LaFata) from San Francisco, California. Gold Chains has performed along with Sue Cie (real name Sue Costabile), a video artist also from the San Francisco area.

Early life
LaFata grew up in Reading, Pennsylvania, and attended Trinity College in Hartford, Connecticut, where he earned a degree in cognitive neuroscience. He moved to San Francisco in 1995.

Career

2001-2002: First EP releases

2003: Young Miss America

2004-2005: Collaboration with Sue Cie and US tours

Hiatus and side projects

2013: Sluts

Aftermath of the fire: 2015-present
A massive four-alarm fire in San Francisco's Mission District left one person dead and six injured. Along with the offices of nearby nonprofit Mission Local, the blaze completely destroyed LaFata's apartment of 18 years, all his belongings and gear, and the studio in which he recorded Gold Chains material.

Discography
 Gold Chains EP (October, 2001, Orthlorng Musork, OTH07)
 Straight from your Radio EP (July 16, 2002, Tigerbeat6, MEOW056)
 Young Miss America (2003, Play It Again Sam)
 When The World Was Our Friend with Sue Cie (October 12, 2004, Kill Rock Stars)
 Sluts (Aug 18, 2013, Gold Club)

References

External links 
 Official site for Gold Chains
 Official site for Sue Cie
 

Living people
Year of birth missing (living people)
American rappers
Kitty-Yo artists
People from San Francisco
21st-century American rappers